McWhorter Stadium is a softball park in the southeastern United States, located in Clemson, South Carolina. It is primarily used for NCAA and is the home field of the Clemson Tigers  of the Division I Atlantic Coast Conference.  The stadium opened in 2020, with the launch of the Tiger softball program, and contains seating for 1,000, additional spectator space on a grass berm, and player development areas.

On February 5, 2021, Clemson University announced that Stuart McWhorter and his family had donated $2.5 million to the softball program, and that the stadium would therefore be named in their honor.

References

College softball venues in the United States
Clemson Tigers softball
Clemson Tigers sports venues
Softball venues in South Carolina
Sports venues completed in 2020
2020 establishments in South Carolina